McCranie's Turpentine Still is a historic site in Willacoochee, Georgia.  It was added to the National Register of Historic Places on June 28, 1976. It is located west of Willacoochee on U.S. 82.

History
The McCranie family worked in the turpentine industry prior to 1900 and continued for generations. This turpentine still was built in 1936, based on designs and methods from earlier eras.  It was operated by three McCranie brothers.  It ceased operation in 1942 when the two elder McCranie brothers went to war. The replacement of the fire distillation process by steam distillation and the labor shortage caused by World War II contributed to its closure.  The still remains largely intact.

Photos

See also
National Register of Historic Places listings in Atkinson County, Georgia
Naval stores industry

References

Further reading
 "Stills, Murals, & Mills", by Lynne Taylor, Georgia Backroads, Spring 2008, pp. 33-35.

External links
 

Buildings and structures in Atkinson County, Georgia
Industrial buildings and structures on the National Register of Historic Places in Georgia (U.S. state)
National Register of Historic Places in Atkinson County, Georgia